Tommy Vig (July 14, 1938) is a percussionist, arranger, bandleader, and composer.

Life and work

Born to a musical family in Budapest, Tommy Vig was internationally recognized as a child prodigy by the age of 6, playing drums with his father, clarinetist Gyorgy Vig.  He performed concerts in Budapest on State Radio, at the City Theatre, the Academy of Music, and the National Circus.  At the age of 8, he made the album The World Champion Kid Drummer with Austrian jazz players in Vienna, including Hans Koller, Ernst Landl, and the Hot Club of Vienna for Elite Special.  At the age of 9, his drumming won him the 1947 MGM-Jazz Competition in Budapest. As a result, he made several recordings with the Chappy's Mopex Big Band for His Master's Voice.

Vig completed his studies at the Bartók Conservatory in 1955 and the Ferenc Erkel Music High School in 1956. Following the crushing of the Hungarian Revolution of 1956, he fled to Vienna, where he played concerts with Fatty George and Joe Zawinul. After moving to the United States, he was given a scholarship to Juilliard School of Music. Since then he has been writing and conducting concerts. Vig worked with Red Rodney, Don Ellis, Cat Anderson, Terry Gibbs, Art Pepper, Milcho Leviev, Joe Pass, and the Miles Davis-Gil Evans Big Band. In 1961 he settled in Las Vegas, where he performed with Frank Sinatra, Sammy Davis Jr., Tony Curtis, Woody Allen, Judy Garland, and Tony Bennett. He was the percussionist on many of Rod Stewart's albums.

In 1970, Vig moved to Los Angeles, where he worked in the studios of Warner Bros., Fox, Universal, CBS, Columbia, ABC, Disney, Goldwyn, MGM, and Paramount. He participated in about 1500 studio sessions in Hollywood, including two Academy Awards, and produced, directed, and conducted the official 1984 Olympic Jazz Festival for the Los Angeles Olympic Organizing Committee. He also organized and conducted the annual Las Vegas Caesars Palace Mini-Jazz Festivals for many years. He wrote the music for 30 films and television shows, including They Call Me Bruce? and The Kid with the Broken Halo. As a percussionist, he participated in the recording of Quincy Jones's soundtrack to Roots. He played on the Jazz Festival Münster 1986 with Lajos Dudas and participated with the hr-Jazzensemble and Martin Breinschmid.

Vig gave master classes at California State University, Northridge, and at the Tatabánya Jazz Academy. Over the past fifty years his classical compositions were performed by symphony orchestras in the United States, Germany, and Hungary. He was vice president of the American Society of Music Arrangers and Composers. Vig was awarded the EmErTon Prize by the Hungarian State Radio in Budapest in 1994. The Hungarian Jazz Federation awarded him first prize in Musical Arrangement in 2006, while the Budapest Jazz Orchestra commissioned and performed his piece "Budapest 1956" in front of U.S. Ambassador April H. Foley at the Museum of Fine Arts.

Since 2006, Vig has lived with his wife Mia (of The Kim Sisters) in Hungary, where they have been performing concerts, appearing on radio and television, and recording albums, including ÜssDob (B'eat It!, Tom-Tom Records), Now and Then (Pannon Jazz), and Welcome to Hungary! The Tommy Vig Orchestra 2012 Featuring David Murray (Klasszikus Jazz, 2011).

Vig invented the scientific method of Non-Subjective Valuing (U.S. Patent 6038554) which is detailed in his book How to Tell What Things Are Really Worth.

Awards 

 Gold Medal Recognition from the President of Hungary (2011)
 Nominee; Playboy Magazine (Chicago) for Best Bandleader of the Year
 Winner; Down Beat Magazine (Chicago) Critic's Poll Talent Deserving of Wider Recognition for Vibraharp
 Winner; Hungarian Jazz Society Arranger Competition (2006)
 Vibe Summit Honoree; Los Angeles Jazz Society Top Award for Vibraharp (2002)
 Winner; EmErTon Prize by the Hungarian State Radio in Budapest (1994)
 "Olympic Jazz Festival Week" declared by Los Angeles Mayor Tom Bradley for Vig's production of the official Olympic Jazz Festival (1984)

Discography

Albums 
 The Tommy Vig Orchestra (Take 5, 1964)
 Encounter with Time a.k.a. Space Race  (Discovery, 1967)
 The Sound of the Seventies (Milestone, 1968)
 Just for the Record (1971)
 Tommy Vig in Budapest (Mortney, 1972)
 Somebody Loves Me (Dobre, 1976)
 Encounter with Time (Discovery, 1977)
 Tommy Vig 1978, (Dobre, 1978)
 ÜssDob (Tom-Tom, 2008)
 Welcome to Hungary! The Tommy Vig Orchestra 2012 Featuring David Murray (Klasszikus Jazz, 2011)
  Tommy Vig 75! (Klasszikus Jazz, 2014)

Film and television scores 
 1970s–1980s: This Is the Life (TV series)
 1974: Nightmare Circus (aka The Barn of the Naked Dead or Terror Circus)
 1975: Forced Entry
 1975–1976: Doctors' Hospital (TV Series)
 1979: Starsky and Hutch (TV Series) "Birds of a Feather"
 1981: Ruckus
 1981: Texas Lightning
 1982: The Kid with the Broken Halo (TV movie) 
 1982: They Call Me Bruce?
 1983: Sweet Sixteen

Compositions 
Tommy Vig's compositions performed in the U.S. and Europe include:
 Concerto for Clarinet, Vibraharp and Orchestra
 Concerto for Vibraharp and Orchestra 
 Concerto for Timpani and Orchestra
 Concerto for Tenor Saxophone and Orchestra
 Four Pieces for Neophonic Orchestra
 Collage for Four Clarinetists
 A Clarinetist and a Harpist
 Music for Tuba and Vibraharp 
 Budapest 1956 (Concerto for Jazz Drums and Orchestra)

Collaborations 
With Rod Stewart
 A Night on the Town (Warner Bros. Records, 1976)
 Foot Loose & Fancy Free (Warner Bros. Records, 1977)
 Blondes Have More Fun (Warner Bros. Records, 1978)
 Tonight I'm Yours (Warner Bros. Records, 1981)
 Body Wishes (Warner Bros. Records, 1983)

With The Manhattan Transfer
 Pastiche (Atlantic Records, 1978)

With The Beach Boys
 L.A. (Light Album) (CBS Records, 1979)

With Art Garfunkel
 Watermark (Columbia Records, 1977)
 Scissors Cut (Columbia Records, 1981)

With Dusty Springfield
 It Begins Again (United Artists Records, 1978)

With Diana Ross
 Red Hot Rhythm & Blues (EMI, 1987)

With Stephen Bishop
 Bish (ABC Records, 1978)

With Marlena Shaw
 Acting Up (Columbia Records, 1978)

See also 
 List of music arrangers

References

External links 
 Official site
 

20th-century American composers
20th-century American drummers
20th-century classical composers
21st-century American composers
21st-century American drummers
21st-century classical composers
1938 births
American classical composers
American film score composers
American jazz bandleaders
American jazz composers
American jazz drummers
American jazz educators
American jazz percussionists
American jazz vibraphonists
American male classical composers
American male drummers
American session musicians
American television composers
Avant-garde jazz musicians
Avant-garde jazz percussionists
Bass drum players
Bebop arrangers
Bebop musicians
Big band bandleaders
Classical timpanists
Composers for chimes
Cool jazz arrangers
Cool jazz drummers
Experimental big band arrangers
Experimental big band bandleaders
Free improvising musicians
Free jazz musicians
Hard bop drummers
Hungarian classical composers
Hungarian classical musicians
Hungarian conductors (music)
Male conductors (music)
Hungarian emigrants to the United States
Hungarian film score composers
Hungarian jazz musicians
Hungarian jazz vibraphonists
Jazz record producers
Living people
Hungarian male classical composers
American male film score composers
American male jazz composers
Marimbists
Musicians from Budapest
Musicians from Los Angeles
Orchestra leaders
Orchestral jazz musicians
Post-bop arrangers
Progressive big band bandleaders
Snare drummers
Third stream musicians
Timpanists
Triangle players
Tubular bells players
West Coast jazz drummers
Xylophonists
Jazz musicians from California
Classical musicians from California
20th-century American male musicians
21st-century American male musicians
20th-century jazz composers
21st-century jazz composers
Jazz vibraphonists